The Budućnost–Crvena Zvezda basketball rivalry is an Adriatic League (ABA League) rivalry between Budućnost and Crvena zvezda. While the two teams have played each other since Budućnost joined the Yugoslav League in 1980, their rivalry began to develop in the 1990s through the Serbian-Montenegrin League and reached its peak in the Adriatic League during the late 2010s and early 2020s with 3-in-a-row League Finals (2018, 2019, and 2021).

History

1980s: Yugoslavia 
The first time these two teams actually met was in 1980 when Budućnost qualified for the Yugoslav League for the first time in history. The first derby finished 105–91 in Zvezda's favour. Generally, the rivalry wasn’t prominent in the Yugoslav era since both teams had fluctuations in their results in the 80’s, thus they didn’t have the status as constant contenders for the title.

Head-to-head ranking

1992–2006: Serbia and Montenegro

Head-to-head ranking

2003 onwards: Adriatic

Head-to-head ranking

Finals summaries

2018 ABA League Finals 

This was the first ABA League Finals series between Budućnost and Crvena Zvezda, and the first Finals of any competition to occur between Budućnost and Crvena Zvezda since their first meeting in 1980. Budućnost hadn't made an appearance in the ABA Finals prior to 2018. Budućnost won the championship, 3–1. Nemanja Gordić of Budućnost was named the Finals MVP.

2018 ABA SuperCup Final 

The Budućnost and Crvena Zvezda would meet the six months after the 2018 ABA League Finals in Laktaši, Bosnia and Herzegovina. Crvena Zvezda would defeat Budućnost and win their first ABA SuperCup title. The Zvezda had an 89–75 victory, while Budućnost lost its second Supercup Final.

The Zvezda led 48–23 in the middle of the second quarter and sustained to 57–32 to lead by 25 at halftime. As the first half ended, so did the second half. Buducnost took advantage of the relaxation of the Belgraders in the last quarter and mitigated the defeat to a more acceptable 14 points difference.

The Zvezda's Mouhammad Faye had 14 points and four rebounds, and Maik Zirbes added 13 points and five rebounds. Joe Ragland recorded 10 points and the game-high 7 assists, while Stratos Perperoglou and Ognjen Dobrić both had 12 points off the bench. Budućnost was led by Filip Barović with 19 points and five rebounds of the bench, and Earl Clark added 11 points. Faye was named the MVP Award.

2019 ABA League Finals 

The 2019 ABA League Finals saw Budućnost and Crvena Zvezda meet for the second straight season. Crvena Zvezda won Games 1 and 2 in Belgrade before the series moved to Podgorica. While Budućnost won Game 3 and 4 at home, the Zvezda took Game 5 at home, earning their fourth championship and their fourth in five seasons.

Game 2 was a more one-sided affair, with the Zvezda winning 107–69. Game 5 was a blowout victory for the Zvezda, 97–54, led by K. C. Rivers with the game-high 21 points. The Zvezda's Billy Baron was named the Finals MVP.

2021 ABA League Finals 

The 2019 ABA League Finals saw Budućnost and Crvena Zvezda meet for the third straight season. Crvena Zvezda won Games 1 and 2 in Belgrade before the series moved to Podgorica. While Budućnost won Game 3 and 4 at home, the Zvezda took Game 5 at home, earning their fifth championship and their fifth in seven seasons.

Head-to-head

Matches 
The following are the matches between Budućnost and Crvena Zvezda in the Adriatic League:

Matches in defunct competitions

1980–1992: Yugoslavia 
The following were the matches between Budućnost and Crvena Zvezda in the Yugoslav competitions:

1992–2006: Serbia and Montenegro 
The following were the matches between Budućnost and Crvena Zvezda in Yugoslav/Serb–Montenegrin competitions:

Statistics
Note: Last updated on

Common individuals

Players 
The following players have played for both Budućnost and Crvena zvezda in their careers:

 Milutin Aleksić – Crvena zvezda (2000–2002); Budućnost (2002–2004)
 Dragan Apić – Crvena zvezda (2017); Budućnost (2020–2021)
 Nemanja Arnautović – Budućnost (2010); Crvena zvezda (2010)
 Boris Bakić – Budućnost (2003–2004); Crvena zvezda (2007–2011)
 Goran Bošković – Budućnost (1998–1999); Crvena zvezda (1999–2000)
 Omar Cook – Crvena zvezda (2007–2008); Budućnost (2014–2016)
 Goran Ćakić – Budućnost (2002); Crvena zvezda (2002–2003)
 Tadija Dragićević – Crvena zvezda (2004–2005, 2006–2010, 2014); Budućnost (2015–2016)
 Vladislav Dragojlović – Crvena zvezda (2003–2006); Budućnost (2007–2008)
 Igor Đaletić – Budućnost (1989–1990, 1992–1993, 1995–1997); Crvena zvezda (2002)
 Vladislav Dragojlović – Crvena zvezda (1978–1980); Budućnost (1984–1985)
 Aleksandar Gilić – Crvena zvezda (1988–1990, 1993–1996); Budućnost (1996–1997)
 Nikola Ivanović – Budućnost (2011–2015, 2017–2021); Crvena zvezda (2021–present)
 Marko Jagodić-Kuridža – Crvena zvezda (2019–2021); Budućnost (2021–present)
 Goran Jeretin – Crvena zvezda (2002–2006); Budućnost (2006, 2009–2010)
 Nikola Jestratijević – Crvena zvezda (1994–1995, 1998–2000, 2004); Budućnost (2001–2002)
 Zoran Jovanović – Crvena zvezda (1987–1993); Budućnost (1997–1998)
 Siniša Kovačević – Crvena zvezda (1996–1997); Budućnost (2002–2003)
 Vladimir Kuzmanović – Crvena zvezda (1997–1998); Budućnost (1999–2002)
 Marko Lekić – Crvena zvezda (2008); Budućnost (2009–2010)
 Hassan Martin – Budućnost (2019–2020); Crvena zvezda (2022–present)
 Stevan Milošević – Budućnost (2004–2007); Crvena zvezda (2008)
 Strahinja Milošević – Crvena zvezda (2010–2011); Budućnost (2012–2013)

 Nenad Mišanović – Crvena zvezda (2005–2008); Budućnost (2008–2009)
 Luka Mitrović – Crvena zvezda (2012–2017; 2021–present); Budućnost (2020–2021)
 Aleksej Nešović – Crvena zvezda (2002–2004); Budućnost (2010–2011)
 Saša Obradović – Crvena zvezda (1987–1993, 1993–1994, 1999–2000); Budućnost (2000–2001)
 Alen Omić – Crvena zvezda (2018); Budućnost (2018)
 Luka Pavićević – Budućnost (1984–1985), Crvena zvezda (1995–1996, 1998–1999, 2002–2003)
 Stevan Peković – Budućnost (1990–1992, 1997–1998), Crvena zvezda (1998–1999, 2001–2002)
 Igor Perović – Crvena zvezda (1996–1998); Budućnost (2001–2002)
 Ivo Petović – Budućnost (1981–1983); Crvena zvezda (1983–1990)
 Igor Rakočević – Crvena zvezda (1994–2000, 2003–2004, 2012–2013); Budućnost (2000–2002)
 Boris Savović – Budućnost (2009–2010, 2015, 2016–2017); Crvena zvezda (2012–2013)
 Marko Simonović – Budućnost (2008–2011); Crvena zvezda (2012–2014, 2015–2017, 2020–2022)
 Bojan Subotić – Crvena zvezda (2011–2013); Budućnost (2013–2017)
 Vujadin Subotić – Budućnost (1999–2000); Crvena zvezda (2004–2006, 2008, 2010–2011)
 Vladimir Tica – Crvena zvezda (1998–2003, 2007); Budućnost (2011–2012)
 Dejan Tomašević – Crvena zvezda (1990–1995); Budućnost (1999–2001)
 Željko Topalović – Crvena zvezda (1997–1998, 1999–2000); Budućnost (1998–1999)
 Milenko Topić – Crvena zvezda (1997–1999); Budućnost (1999–2001)
 Čedomir Vitkovac – Crvena zvezda (2003–2006); Budućnost (2009–2010, 2011–2015)
 Slavko Vraneš – Budućnost (2001–2003, 2004–2007); Crvena zvezda (2004)
 Aaron White – Crvena zvezda (2021–2022); Budućnost (2022)
 Marcus Williams – Crvena zvezda (2014–2015); Budućnost (2016–2017)

The following players have played for one club in youth system career and for rival club in senior career:
 Vladimir Micov – Crvena zvezda (youth system), Budućnost (senior team)

The following players have played for both Crvena zvezda and Partizan in their youth system careers: 
 Andrija Vuković – Budućnost than Crvena zvezda

Coaches 
The following head coaches have coached both Budućnost and Crvena zvezda in their careers:
 Vlade Đurović – Crvena zvezda (1986–1988); Budućnost (2002)
 Momir Milatović – Budućnost (N/A); Crvena zvezda (1999)
 Miroslav Nikolić – Budućnost (1998–2000); Crvena zvezda (2001, 2002)
 Dejan Radonjić – Budućnost (2005–2013); Crvena zvezda (2013–2017, 2021–2022)

The following assistant coaches have coached both Budućnost and Crvena zvezda in their careers: 
 Nikola Birač – Crvena zvezda (2011–2017, 2020–2022); Budućnost (2022–present)

Others 
The following individuals have also played and/or coached both Budućnost and Crvena zvezda in their careers:
 Duško Ivanović – Budućnost (1980–1987 player); Crvena zvezda (2022–present coach)
 Momir Milatović – Budućnost (N/A player, N/A coach); Crvena zvezda (1999 coach)
 Saša Obradović – Crvena zvezda (1987–1993, 1993–1994, 1999–2000 player; 2020 coach); Budućnost (2000–2001 player)
 Luka Pavićević – Budućnost (1984–1985 player; 2015–2016 coach), Crvena zvezda (1995–1996, 1998–1999, 2002–2003 player)
 Mihailo Pavićević – Budućnost (1979–1981, 1988–1989 player), Crvena zvezda (1997, 1998 coach)
 Dejan Radonjić – Budućnost (1991–1993, 1998–2002 player; 2005–2013 coach); Crvena zvezda (2013–2017, 2020–2022 coach)
 Zoran Sretenović – Crvena zvezda (1985–1986, 1995–1996 player), Budućnost (2001–2002 coach)
 Milenko Topić – Crvena zvezda (1997–1999 player; 2018 coach); Budućnost (1999–2001 player)

Honours
The rivalry reflected in derby matches comes about as Budućnost is the most successful basketball club in Montenegro, while Crvena zvezda is the second most successful club in Serbia.

See also 
 Crvena Zvezda–Partizan basketball rivalry
 List of sports rivalries

Notes

References

External links
 
 

ABA League
Basketball rivalries
KK Budućnost
KK Crvena Zvezda